Sekhemkheperre Osorkon I was an ancient Egyptian pharaoh of the 22nd Dynasty. Osorkon's territory included much of the Levant.

The Osorkon Bust found at Byblos is one of the five Byblian royal inscriptions.

Biography
The son of Shoshenq I and his chief consort Karomat A, Osorkon I was the second king of ancient Egypt's 22nd Dynasty and ruled around 922 BC – 887 BC. He succeeded his father Shoshenq I, who probably died within a year of his successful 923 BC campaign against the Pilistines and the kingdom of Israel. Osorkon I's reign is known for many temple building projects and was a long and prosperous period of Egypt's history. His highest known date is a "Year 33" date found on the bandage of Nakhtefmut's mummy, which held a menat-tab necklace inscribed with Osorkon I's nomen and prenomen: Osorkon Sekhemkheperre. This date can only belong to Osorkon I since no other early Dynasty 22 king ruled for close to 30 years until Osorkon II. Other mummy linens, which belong to his reign, include three separate bandages dating to his regnal years 11, 12, and 23 on the mummy of Khonsmaakheru in Berlin. The bandages are anonymously dated but definitely belong to his reign because Khonsmaakheru wore leather bands that contained a menat-tab naming Osorkon I. Secondly, no other king who ruled around Osorkon I's reign had a 23rd regnal year including Shoshenq I who died just before the beginning of his 22nd.

While Manetho gives Osorkon I a reign of 15 years in his Ægyptiaca, this is most likely an error for 35 years based on the evidence of the second Heb Sed bandage, as Kenneth Kitchen notes.  Osorkon I's throne name, Sekhemkheperre, means "Powerful are the Manifestations of Re".

Succession
Although Osorkon I is thought to have been directly succeeded by his son Takelot I, it is possible that another ruler, Heqakheperre Shoshenq II, intervened briefly between these two kings because Takelot I was a son of Osorkon I through Queen Tashedkhons, a secondary wife of this king.  In contrast, Osorkon I's senior wife was Queen Maatkare B, who may have been Shoshenq II's mother. However, Shoshenq II could also have been another son of Shoshenq I since the latter was the only other king to be mentioned in objects from Shoshenq II's intact royal tomb at Tanis aside from Shoshenq II himself. These objects are inscribed with either Shoshenq I's praenomen Hedjkheperre Shoshenq (though this is not certain as it requires reading the objects as a massive hieroglyphic text), or Shoshenq, Great Chief of the Meshwesh, which was Shoshenq I's title before he became king. Since Derry's forensic examination of his mummy reveals him to be a man in his fifties upon his death, Shoshenq II could have lived beyond Osorkon's 35-year reign and Takelot I's 13-year reign to assume the throne for a few years. An argument against this hypothesis is that most kings of the period were commonly named after their grandfathers, and not their fathers.

While the British scholar Kenneth A. Kitchen views Shoshenq II to be the high priest of Amun at Thebes Shoshenq C, and a short-lived coregent of Osorkon I who predeceased his father, the German Egyptologist Jürgen von Beckerath in his 1997 book Chronologie des Pharaonischen Ägypten maintains that Shoshenq II was rather an independent king of Tanis who ruled the 22nd Dynasty in his own right for about two years. Von Beckerath's hypothesis is supported by Shoshenq II's employment of a complete royal titulary along with a distinct prenomen Heqakheperre and his intact tomb at Tanis was filled with numerous treasures including jeweled pectorals and bracelets, an impressive falcon-headed silver coffin and a gold face mask—items which indicate a genuine king of the 22nd Dynasty. More significantly, however, no mention of Osorkon I's name was preserved on any ushabtis, jars, jewelry or other objects within Shoshenq II's tomb. This situation would be improbable if he was indeed Osorkon I's son, and was buried by his father, as Kitchen's chronology suggests. These facts, taken together, imply that Sheshonq II ruled on his own accord at Tanis and was not a mere coregent.

Manetho's Epitome states that "3 Kings for 25 years" separate Osorkon I from a Takelot (Takelothis). This could be an error on Manetho's part or an allusion to Shoshenq II's reign. It may also be a reference to the recently discovered early Dynasty 22 king Tutkheperre, whose existence is now corroborated by an architectural block from the Great Temple of Bubastis, where Osorkon I and Osorkon II are well attested monumentally.

Osorkon I's reign in Egypt was peaceful and uneventful; however, both his son and grandson, Takelot I and Osorkon II respectively, later encountered difficulties controlling Thebes and Upper Egypt within their own reigns since they had to deal with a rival king: Harsiese A. Osorkon I's tomb has never been found.

See also
Pi-Sekhemkheperre – a now-lost stronghold in Middle Egypt, founded by Osorkon I

Gallery

References

Bibliography
 Mostafa El-Alfi, "A Donation Stela from the time of Osorkon I", Discussions in Egyptology 24 (1992), 13-19
 Hartwig Altenmüller, "Lederbänder und Lederanhänger von der Mumie des Chonsu-maacheru" and "Die Mumienbinden des Chonsu-maacheru " in Alt-Ägypten 30(2000), pp. 73–76, 88–89, 102–114. 
 Jürgen von Beckerath, Chronologie des Pharaonischen Ägypten or 'Chronology of the Egyptian Pharaohs,'(Mainz: 1997), Philip Zon Zabern
 Peter Clayton, Chronology of the Pharaohs, Thames & Hudson Ltd, 1994
 Kenneth Kitchen, The Third Intermediate Period in Egypt (1100–650 BC) 3rd ed, (Warminster: 1996), Aris & Phillips Limited
 Helen K. Jaquet-Gordon, The illusory year 36 of osorkon I, JEA 53 (1967), 63–68
 Eva Lange, "Ein Neuer König Schoschenk in Bubastis", GM 203 (2004), pp. 65–71
 Eva Lange, "Legitimation und Herrschaft in der Libyerzeit", Zeitschrift für Ägyptische Sprache und Altertumskunde 135 (2008), 131-141

External links

 Osorkon Dynasty at ancientworlds.net

10th-century BC births
887 BC deaths
10th-century BC Pharaohs
9th-century BC Pharaohs
Pharaohs of the Twenty-second Dynasty of Egypt
Year of birth unknown